Kagara may refer to:

Places
Kagara, Niger State, a town and emirate in Niger State, Nigeria
Kagara sima, an island in Saga Prefecture, Japan
Kagara, Sokoto, a village in Sokoto State, Nigeria
Kagera Region, a part of Tanzania
Kagera River, a river that originates in Burundi and flows into Lake Victoria

Other
Kagara Ltd, an Australian mining company
ǂKá̦gára, a character in San mythology
469705 ǂKá̦gára, a Trans-Neptunian object named after ǂKá̦gára